'Confusion Girl' is a song by British electropop singer Frankmusik from his debut album Complete Me, which was released on 3 August 2009.

Song information
The song was released on 19 July 2009 and received significant airplay. It featured on Radio 1's 'A List' prior to its release.

Music video
The music video consists of Frankmusik (real name Vincent Frank) walking around town trying to find the woman he had lost, played by Holly Valance, whom he tracks down by the end of the video.

The video shows him being completely oblivious to what is going on around him, as he is so caught up in his search for his love interest.

It was filmed on location in Mile End Park and Clinton Road, Mile End, London.

Track listings and formats
UK CD single
 Confusion Girl
 Confusion Girl (vs Tinchy Stryder)
 It's a Sin (Pet Shop Boys Cover)
 Confusion Girl (Original Demo Version)

Digital Download 1 (iTunes)
Confusion Girl (Shame Shame Shame) - Single
 Confusion Girl
 Such Great Heights (The Postal Service Cover)

Digital Download 2 (iTunes)
Confusion Girl (Shame Shame Shame) EP
 Confusion Girl (Radio Edit)
 Confusion Girl (Tinchy Stryder version)
 Confusion Girl (Riffs and Rays remix feat. Tinchy Stryder)
 Confusion Girl (Confused Boy Dub) knob boy
 Confusion Girl (Crimes Against Disco Remix)
 Confusion Girl (Don Diablo Loves to Slowdance remix)

Charts
The song entered the UK Singles Chart at number 29 on the 26 July 2009.

References

2009 singles
2009 songs
Frankmusik songs
Island Records singles
Song recordings produced by Stuart Price